Reggie Lewis (born May 30, 1984) is a former gridiron football cornerback. He was signed by the Buffalo Bills as an undrafted free agent in 2007. He played college football at Florida.

Lewis was also a member of the Tampa Bay Storm and Toronto Argonauts.

Early years
Lewis received All-American honors from PrepStar when he was ranked among the top 12 players in the Southeast athlete category. He was also named the Florida Times-Union’s Offensive Player of the year for North Central Florida in 2000.

College career
Lewis attended the University of Florida, where he, majored in Sociology, and played in a career total of 50 games, with 16 starts. As a freshman and sophomore, he played wide receiver then was switched to cornerback for the rest of his college career. His first career interception helped Florida to a double-overtime win over Vanderbilt. In 2005, he recovered a blocked field goal and returned it for a touchdown, the first in school history, against Florida State. In that same season, he intercepted a pass to help seal a 14-10 Florida win over Georgia. He recorded an interception and a pass broken up against Arkansas in the 2006 SEC Championship Game, he also intercepted a pass thrown by Heisman Trophy winner, Troy Smith of Ohio State in the 2007 BCS National Championship Game. Lewis was also named to the 2007 Hula Bowl.

Professional career

National Football League
Lewis went unselected in the 2007 NFL Draft and signed with the Buffalo Bills on May 3, 2007. However, he was released on August 27, 2007.

Arena Football League
In 2008 Lewis signed with the Tampa Bay Storm of the Arena Football League. Lakeland Raiders 2013

Canadian Football League
Lewis was signed by the Toronto Argonauts on February 25, 2009. He was released on June 7, 2009.

References

Bibliography 

Carlson, Norm, University of Florida Football Vault: The History of the Florida Gators, Whitman Publishing, LLC, Atlanta, Georgia (2007).  .

External links
 Toronto Argonauts bio

1984 births
Living people
Players of American football from Jacksonville, Florida
American football cornerbacks
Canadian football defensive backs
American players of Canadian football
Florida Gators football players
Buffalo Bills players
Tampa Bay Storm players
Toronto Argonauts players
Dallas Vigilantes players